Arab Asad (also Romanized as ‘Arab Asad; also known as Asad Dāūd, Asad Dāvūd, and Boneh-ye Asad Dāvūd) is a village in Miyan Ab Rural District, in the Central District of Shushtar County, Khuzestan Province, Iran. In the 2006 census, its population was 895, in 130 families.

References 

Populated places in Shushtar County